Leizhou or Lei Prefecture was a zhou (prefecture) in imperial China in Leizhou Peninsula, Guangdong. It existed from 634 to 1329, but between 742 and 758 it was known as Haikang Commandery (also translated as Haikang Prefecture).

The modern county-level city Leizhou retains its name.

Counties
Lei Prefecture administered the following counties through history:
Haikang, roughly modern Leizhou.
Suixi, roughly modern Suixi County, Guangdong and Mazhang District, Zhanjiang. Suixi was created in 742 by merging two counties, Tiepa and Shenchuan.
Xuwen, roughly modern Xuwen County.

References

 
 
 

Prefectures of the Tang dynasty
Guangnan West Circuit
Prefectures of Southern Han
Former prefectures in Guangdong
634 establishments
7th-century establishments in China
1278 disestablishments in Asia
13th-century disestablishments in China
Zhanjiang